The Association of Writers of Montenegro (UKCG) (Serbian: Удружење књижевника Црне Горе, Udruženje književnika Crne Gore) is Montenegro's official writing association. The association was established on 8 July 1956. Association's first president was Čedo Vuković. Before the establishment of the association, there was a Montenegrin section within the Yugoslav Writer's Union. The current president is Novica Đurić, who took over the function of Ilija Lakušić. Vice Presidents is Milica Bakrač and Veselin Rakčević, while the Secretary-appointed Aleksandar Ćuković. Sreten Asanović was president from 1973 to 1976.

Mission

The UKCG states its main goals as:
 gathering Montenegrin authors in the same community
 to protect the professional interests of its members
 to work on their interpersonal relationships
 to work on relations with publishers and the general public
 to make their job(s) easier
 to help its members or their families who are in poverty.

Awards
The Makarije's letter life achievement award
The UKCG Award
Award for book of the year

See also
 Association of Writers of Yugoslavia

References

Montenegrin literature
Organisations based in Montenegro
Montenegro